The 2001 Speedway World Cup Qualifying round 3 was the third race of the 2001 Speedway World Cup season. It took place on July 3, 2001 in the Speedway Stadium in Gdańsk, Poland.

Results

Heat details

Heat after heat 
 Sullivan, Hancock, Jirout, Szatmari
 Brhel, Ermolenko, Adams, Magosi (T)
 Crump, A.Dryml jr., Stefani, Janniro
 Werner, Nagy, Lyons, Makovsky
 Wiltshire, Cook, Kasper jr., Szegvari
 Crump, Brhel, Szatmari, Werner
 Janniro, Jirout, Magosi, Lyons
 Sullivan, Ermolenko, Stefani, Makovsky (Fx)
 Adams, Hancock, A.Dryml jr., Nagy
 Wiltshire, Kasper jr., Cook, Szegvari
 A.Dryml jr., Ermolenko (joker), Lyons, Szatmari
 Crump, Hancock, Magosi, Makovsky
 Adams, Jirout, Stefani, Werner
 Brhel, Sullivan, Nagy, Janniro
 Cook, Kasper jr., Wiltshire, Stefani
 Werner, Sullivan, A.Dryml jr., Magosi
 Adams, Janniro, Kasper jr., Szatmari (Fx)
 Brhel, Hancock, Stefani, Lyons (e/start)
 Crump, Ermolenko, Nagy, Jirout
 Wilshire, Kasper jr., Cook, Szegvari
 Wiltshire, Nagy (joker), Werner, Brhel (joker)
 Sullivan, Cook, A.Dryml jr., Magosi
 Adams, Hancock, Kasper jr., Stefani
 Crump, Brhel, Nagy, Ermolenko

See also 
 Motorcycle speedway

References 

E3
Speedway competitions in Poland
2001 in Polish speedway